This is a list of newspapers in the State of Idaho.

Daily newspapersThis is a list of daily newspapers currently published in Idaho. For weekly newspapers, see List of newspapers in Idaho.Non-daily newspapers

 See also 

 List of companies based in Idaho

References